Pia Wedege (born 16 May 1971) is a Norwegian luger. She was born in Oslo, and represented the club Lillehammer Bob- og Akeklubb. She competed at the 1994 Winter Olympics in Lillehammer, where she placed 13th in singles.

References

External links

1971 births
Living people
Sportspeople from Oslo
Norwegian female lugers
Olympic lugers of Norway
Lugers at the 1994 Winter Olympics